Cochliopalpus catherina is a species of beetle in the family Cerambycidae. It was described by White in 1858.

Subspecies
 Cochliopalpus catherina catherina (White, 1858)
 Cochliopalpus catherina naivashae Teocchi, 1997

References

Ceroplesini
Beetles described in 1858